Giovanni Carminucci (14 November 1939 – 16 February 2007) was an Italian gymnast. Together with his elder brother Pasquale he competed in all artistic gymnastics events at the 1960, 1964 and 1968 Olympics and won two medals in 1960: an individual silver in the parallel bars and a team bronze medal; his team placed fourth in 1964.

References

1939 births
2007 deaths
Italian male artistic gymnasts
Gymnasts at the 1960 Summer Olympics
Gymnasts at the 1964 Summer Olympics
Gymnasts at the 1968 Summer Olympics
Olympic gymnasts of Italy
Olympic silver medalists for Italy
Olympic bronze medalists for Italy
Olympic medalists in gymnastics
Medalists at the 1960 Summer Olympics
European champions in gymnastics